Caladenia emarginata, commonly known as the pink enamel orchid, is a plant in the orchid family Orchidaceae and is endemic to the south-west of Western Australia. It is a ground orchid with a single flattened, hairy leaf and up to four glossy pink flowers. It is similar to Caladenia brunonis but is usually a shorter plant but with larger, pink flowers. It has been known as Elythranthera emarginata since 1963 but recent discoveries suggest its inclusion in the genus Caladenia.

Description
Caladenia emarginata is a terrestrial, perennial, deciduous, sympodial herb with a few inconspicuous, fine roots and a tuber partly surrounded by a fibrous, multi-layered protective sheath and often forms colonies. The sepals and petals spread apart from each other and are blotched with red or purple on their backs. Flowering occurs from October to December.

Taxonomy and naming
The pink enamel orchid was first formally described in 1839 by John Lindley who gave it the name Glossodia emarginata and published the description in A Sketch of the Vegetation of the Swan River Colony. In 1871, Heinrich Reichenbach changed the name to Caladenia emarginata and in 1963, Alex George changed it to Elythranthera emarginata. In 2015, as a result of studies of molecular phylogenetics, Mark Clements changed the name to back Caladenia emarginata. The specific epithet (emarginata) is a Latin word meaning "notched at the apex" referring to the two labellum calli.

Elythranthera emarginata is regarded as a synonym of the name Caladenia emarginata which is accepted by the Royal Botanic Gardens, Kew.

Distribution and habitat
Caladenia emarginata is found as far north as Jurien Bay and as far east as Ravensthorpe, often forming colonies or clumps in swamps, near creeks and in dense heath.

Conservation
Caladenia emarginata is classified as "not threatened" by the Western Australian Government Department of Parks and Wildlife.

References

emarginata
Plants described in 1839
Endemic orchids of Australia
Orchids of Western Australia